Delentaria is a genus of fungi in the family Gomphaceae. The genus is monotypic, containing the single species Delentaria decurva, found in Brazil.

References

External links
 

Gomphaceae
Monotypic Basidiomycota genera
Fungi of South America